Mrs Norris may refer to:
A minor character in the Harry Potter series; see Hogwarts staff#Argus Filch
A supporting character in the book Mansfield Park